The IAIO Qaher-313 (Persian: قاهر-۳۱۳; also Ghaher-313, Conqueror (Tamer)-313, Q-313, F-313) is a planned Iranian single-seat stealth fighter aircraft that was publicly announced on 1 February 2013. A press presentation about the project was made by President Mahmoud Ahmadinejad and Defense Minister Ahmad Vahidi on 2 February 2013, as part of the Ten-Day Dawn ceremonies. Independent experts have expressed significant doubts about the viability of the aircraft.

Design and development
According to Iranian government sources, the F-313 Qaher was designed and is indigenously produced in Iran by the Iran Aviation Industries Organization (IAIO), a division of the Ministry of Defense, and IRIAF. The project manager is Hassan Parvaneh.

The aircraft design is a canard configuration.  It is described as a stealth fighter built with advanced materials, a very low radar signature and with low-altitude operations capability. Qaher has a payload capacity of carrying two  bombs, or greater number of smaller smart guided missiles, or at least 6 air-to-air missiles in the category of the PL-12.
It features a downward wingtip device which Flightglobal.com noted vaguely resembles the Boeing Bird of Prey prototype, but with a more faceted design similar to the 1970s-era Lockheed Have Blue that was developed into the now retired F-117 Nighthawk. Flight Global also said, "given the apparent small size of the aircraft and its single engine design, the Qaher 313 could be powered by reverse engineered variants of the General Electric J85 turbojet that Iran is known to have in its possession." Iran has General Electric J85s as well as a dozen other jet engines as a result of old Northrop F-5s and other American aircraft in its inventory from pre-1979 as well as newer engines from Russia and China. Iran also builds various turbine engines like the Toloue-4 and Toloue-5 for its UAVs. Iran claims they have designed the aircraft using CATIA three-dimensional interactive design software and tested it using simulation software including Gambit numerical grid generation software, fluent flow analysis and simulation software, CFD models and that they have additionally tested the aerodynamics using small sized jet and propeller flying models.

The aircraft was reportedly designed with extra stability and so does not need a fly-by-wire (FBW) system.

A prototype version of the Qaher-313 was portrayed to have test-flown at some point before the presentation. According to the head of the design team, two sub-sized models have been created and tested. One of the models uses a propeller engine while the other uses a small micro jet engine. The models were shown in a video clip (along with descriptions by the head of the design team) the same day. According to Haaretz, the "blurry video published by the Iranians purporting to show the Qaher 313 in flight seems to show not a manned fighter jet but a small radio-operated drone" which agrees with what the designers said about the videos at the Qaher-313 introduction ceremony.

On 10 February 2013, the Iranian Minister of Defense said the claims made by the foreign media about the project are inaccurate and that the engine used by the design had been successfully tested. He also confirmed that the aircraft had not yet been flown, but that taxi and flight tests will occur in the near future.

On 5 March 2017, Iranian Defense Minister Brigadier General Hossein Dehghan stated that the Qaher-313 was ready for flight testing. It was described by the Fars News Agency as a "logistic aircraft for short distances" and a "light fighter jet used for military and training operations".

On 15 April 2017, the prototype Qaher-313 conducted taxi tests. This prototype, designated "08", introduced a number of changes over the models previously showcased, most notably an enlarged cockpit, dual jet exhausts, and a FLIR turret in the nose.

Doubts of viability of aircraft

There has been no independent verification of the status of development of this aircraft and some commentators have even claimed that the aircraft is a hoax, or a "laughable fake".  Media sources outside of Iran have raised the possibility that the demonstrated aircraft would not be able to meet stated performance and / or that it may be a scale prototype or mockup, with Cyrus Amini, a BBC News Persian Service journalist claiming that the aircraft "looks like a cheap copy of the American F22". Iran does not release technical details on its arsenals, so many of its claims about the aircraft are impossible to verify.

According to Flight Global, unnamed Israeli experts say the "indigenous fighter jet" Iran presented on 2 February is nothing more than a "very sleek plastic model". Further, the canopy appears to be constructed of "basic plastic," the air intakes are unusually small and "The whole impression is of some plastic parts pasted to an old flying platform". One expert says the cockpit and ejection seat seem real, but the Qaher-313 displayed seemed too small to be a capable fighter. A photo of the cockpit shows a simple glass cockpit design using civilian avionics from Dynon Avionics and Garmin, which are normally found on much less sophisticated general aviation aircraft. Video footage showing the plane airborne could have been a radio-controlled model aircraft. Poor-quality footage posted on the internet provided no sense of scale for the platform being flown and also failed to show its take-off or landing. Its stealth claims have also been called into question, having no visible weapons carrying capability, either internally or externally. Iran has stated that the videos are of small radio controlled jet and propeller models and not the full size airplane. Furthermore, the animation provided by the designers shows two internal weapons bay under the wings.

The Times of Israel labelled the aircraft "a hoax". Israeli aeronautics expert Tal Inbar claimed "It’s not a plane, because that’s not how a real plane looks. Iran doesn’t have the ability to build planes. Plain and simple." Military aviation journalist David Cenciotti stated that the aircraft has "implausible aerodynamics and Hollywood sheen", claimed that it is too small to be a real fighter jet and that the cockpit was too simple and was "similar to those equipping small private planes".

One Israeli aerospace engineer speaking anonymously to The Times of Israel indicated that while the aircraft displayed was obviously not a flying example, it did show advanced stealth features and that the design could be capable of high maneuverability. He stated that while the aircraft lacked bomb-carrying provisions it could be an effective interceptor. He concluded, Iran needs "a defensive interceptor that gives them the element of surprise, and it is big enough to carry real air-to-air missiles."

Cancellation
The managing director of the Iran Aviation Industries Organization (IAIO), a subsidiary of the Defense Ministry, announced in a televised interview on 18 February 2023 that the fighter had reached technical maturity but would be reworked and fielded as an unmanned drone rather than a manned aircraft to adapt it to the requirements of Iranian military units, first deliveries would be made in the middle of 2024. No development progress had been publicly demonstrated since taxi trials took place in 2017.

See also
 Science and technology in Iran
 HESA Shafaq
 313 in Shia Islam

References

External links

 "هواپيماي جنگنده قاهر 313 ساخت وزارت دفاع با حضور رئيس جمهور رونمايي شد" , website of Ministry of Defence

Proposed aircraft of Iran
Twinjets
Mid-wing aircraft
Stealth aircraft